is R. Kelly's collaboration album with his group Public Announcement. Released in January 1992, the album became an R&B hit with the success of singles such as "She's Got That Vibe" (the album's biggest hit in the UK, at #3), "Dedicated," and Kelly's first two #1 R&B hits:  "Honey Love," and "Slow Dance (Hey Mr. DJ)." Honey Love topped the Billboard R&B Singles chart for 2 weeks, while "She's Got That Vibe" and "Slow Dance (Hey Mr DJ)" hit the Top 40 respectively. By June 1992, Born into the 90's was eventually certified platinum and picked up an American Music Award nomination for Favorite Soul/R&B Single ("Honey Love"). This would be R. Kelly's only album with Public Announcement as he separated from the group before he began recording his next album.

Track listing

Personnel 
 Timmy Allen – Programming
 Pete Christensen – Assistant Engineer
 Michael Clark – Producer
 Rick "SL8" Cruz – Engineer, Assistant Engineer
 Gary "Bump City" Daniels - Programming
 Jose Fernandez – Programming
 Georgette Franklin – Background Vocals
 Marcus Geeter – Grooming
 Stephen George – Producer
 Karen Gordon – Background Vocals
 Joe Grant – Photography
 Barry Hankerson – Executive Producer
 Gerard Julien – Engineer, Assistant Engineer
 R. Kelly & Public Announcement – Performer
 R. Kelly – Keyboards, Background Vocals, Producer, Performer, Drum Programming, Mixing
 Steven Levy – Engineer, Assistant Engineer
 Doug Michael – Engineer, Assistant Engineer
 Mr. Lee – Arranger, Programming, Producer, Rap, Performer, Mixing
 Peter Mokran – Engineer, Mixing
 Tim Nitz – Engineer
 Cirland Noel – Engineer
 Tim Nutz – Assistant Engineer
 Herb Powers – Mastering
 Michael Schlesinger – Engineer, Mixing
 Dana Stovall – Background Vocals
 Allan Byrd Tatum – Programming, Background Vocals
 Chris Trevett – Engineer, Mixing
 Tom Vercillo – Programming, Engineer, Mixing
 Bobby West – Keyboards
 Danny Wilensky – Saxophone
 Wayne Williams – Producer
 Nicole Wilson – Background Vocals

Charts

Weekly charts

Year-end charts

Certifications

References

1992 debut albums
R. Kelly albums
Public Announcement albums
Albums produced by R. Kelly
Albums produced by Barry Hankerson
New jack swing albums